Joseph Boum (born 26 September 1989) is a Cameronese footballer who last played for Zira FK as a center back.

Career statistics

Club

References

External links
 

1986 births
Living people
Association football defenders
Cameroonian footballers
Mersin İdman Yurdu footballers
Antalyaspor footballers
Zira FK players
Cameroonian expatriate sportspeople in Azerbaijan
Cameroonian expatriate sportspeople in Turkey